St Peter's Manchester GAA  is a GAA Club based in Manchester, England. 

The club is one of the most successful clubs in Lancashire GAA with 11 Senior Championship Titles and 3 All Britain Titles. St Peters play their Home games at Hough End, Chorlton, Manchester.

In August 2018 St Peters won the Junior Championship title, the first 15 aside trophy won by the club in 4 years.

Honours
 All Britain Champions 2004, 2010,2012 (3)
 Lancashire Senior Championship Winners 2012, 2010, 2005, 2004, 2001, 2000, 1997, 1995, 1993, 1992, 1987 (11)
 Lancashire Senior League Winners 2010, 2011,2012 (2)
 Pennine League Div 1 Winners 2012, 2013 (2) 
 Lancashire Junior Championship Winners 2011, 2018 (2)
 Lancashire Junior League Winners 2010, 2012 (2)

SOS Féile 
On 22 June the club held a charity event in aid of SOS (Stamp Out Suicide) at Hough End. Teams from Liverpool, Manchester and Yorkshire travelled for the day.

References

Gaelic Athletic Association clubs in Britain
Sport in Manchester